Rollinia hispida is a species of tree in the Annonaceae family. It is found in Ecuador and Peru.

References

hispida
Trees of Ecuador
Trees of Peru
Vulnerable flora of South America
Taxonomy articles created by Polbot
Taxobox binomials not recognized by IUCN